Live In Tokyo is a live album by Hughes Turner Project, a collaboration between Glenn Hughes (Deep Purple/ Black Sabbath/ Trapeze) and Joe Lynn Turner (Deep Purple/ Rainbow/ Yngwie Malmsteen); it was released in 2002 on MTM Music and Pony Canyon Records.

History
Live In Tokyo was the only live record to be released by the Hughes Turner Project. The album was recorded at the Shibuya Club Quattro in Tokyo, Japan on May the 17th and 19th 2002 on the first leg of their tour to support their debut album HTP.

The set-list comprises four songs from the HTP album as well as other songs from both Hughes and Turner’s back catalogues including Deep Purple, Rainbow and Black Sabbath numbers. For the most part the two sing their own songs solo, only performing duets on the HTP songs.

For the Japanese leg of tour the pair were joined by native musicians Akira Kajiyama (guitar), Toshio Egawa (keyboards) and Yoshihiro Kudo (drums). While Kajiyama had contributed some guitar solos to the HTP album, the others had not taken part in its recording and this is the only Hughes Turner Project release they appear on.

The European version of the album included the studio track Against The Wall, which had originally been released as the bonus track on the Japanese version of HTP. However, the European version excludes the live recording of the Black Sabbath track "No Stranger to Love", which only appears on the Japanese version.

Track listing
"Devil's Road" – 6:11 (Hughes, Marsh, Turner)
"You Can't Stop Rock and Roll" – 4:45 (Hughes, Marsh, Turner)
"Death Alley Driver" – 4:22 (Blackmore, Turner)
"I Surrender" – 4:11 (Ballard)
"Stormbringer" – 4:41 (Blackmore, Coverdale)
"Dark Days" – 3:57 (Kajiyama, Turner)
"Mistreated" – 9:15 (Blackmore, Coverdale)
"No Stranger To Love" – 7:23 (Tony Iommi) (Japanese and USA version CDs only)
"Can't Stop the Flood" – 3:41 (Hughes, Marsh)
"Better Man" – 6:00 (Hughes)
"Ride the Storm" – 4:03 (Hughes, Marsh, Turner)
"King of Dreams" – 6:44 (Blackmore, Glover, Turner)
"Street of Dreams" – 5:01 (Blackmore, Turner)
"Spotlight Kid" – 5:08 (Blackmore, Glover)
"Against The Wall" – 4:36 (Hughes, Marsh, Turner) (European version only)

Personnel
Glenn Hughes – Vocals/ Bass
Joe Lynn Turner – Vocals/ Guitar
Akira Kajiyama – Guitars
Yoshihiro Kudo – Drums
Toshio Egawa – Keyboards

References
Live In Tokyo entry at glennhughes.com

Glenn Hughes albums
Joe Lynn Turner albums
Collaborative albums
2002 live albums